Winston Bronnum (1929-1991) was a self-taught Dano-Canadian nature artist, sculptor and entrepreneur known for his large concrete animal sculptures which adorn Canadian roadsides. He founded and operated the defunct Animaland Park which showcased a number of his works and served as his workshop.  He worked on bridges and hydro dams early on which helped when designing and building the structures. His family name was originally spelled Brønnum.

Notable works
 The Cow Bay Moose, Cow Bay, Nova Scotia, 1959
 Gladstone Horse, Saint John, New Brunswick, 1967
 Broken Down Race Horse (Blowhard), Penobsquis, New Brunswick, 1967
 Maugerville Potato, Maugerville, New Brunswick, 1969
 Jumbo the Elephant, St. Thomas, Ontario, 1985
 The World's Largest Lobster, Shediac, New Brunswick, 1990

References

Roadside attractions in Canada
Sculptures in Canada
People from Victoria County, New Brunswick
1929 births
1991 deaths
Canadian people of Danish descent